John Denis Browne, 1st Marquess of Sligo,  (11 June 1756 – 2 January 1809) was an Irish peer, absentee slaveholder and politician, and was the son of Peter Browne, 2nd Earl of Altamont, and his wife Elizabeth, née Kelly, heiress and daughter of Denis Kelly, Chief Justice of Jamaica. Peter's marriage to Elizabeth led to the family inheriting the Kelly's slave plantations in Jamaica.

Browne was styled Viscount Westport from 1771 to 1780 and known as John Browne, 3rd Earl of Altamont from 1780 to 1800. Browne represented Jamestown in the Irish House of Commons from 1776 to 1780, when he succeeded as Earl of Altamont. He served as High Sheriff of Mayo for 1779. He became Marquess of Sligo on 29 December 1800 and was appointed a Knight of the Order of St Patrick on 5 August 1800. He died on 2 June 1809 in Lisbon, Portugal.

Family
He was married to Lady Louisa Catherine Howe, daughter of Richard Howe, 1st Earl Howe in 1787. After their marriage, she was known as the Countess of Altamont and then the Marchioness of Sligo. His great-grandnephew was the British composer and poet, William Charles Denis Browne (1888–1915).

References

1756 births
1809 deaths
Westport, John Browne, Viscount
Irish representative peers
Irish slave owners
Knights of St Patrick
Politicians from County Mayo
Westport, John Browne, Viscount
Members of the Privy Council of Ireland
High Sheriffs of Mayo
John
Members of the Irish House of Lords
John 1